Content ID is a digital fingerprinting system developed by Google which is used to easily identify and manage copyrighted content on YouTube. Videos uploaded to YouTube are compared against audio and video files registered with Content ID by content owners, looking for any matches. Content owners have the choice to have matching content blocked or to monetize it. The system began to be implemented around 2007. By 2016, it had cost $60 million to develop and led to around $2 billion in payments to copyright holders. By 2018, Google had invested at least $100 million into the system.

Overview 
Content ID creates an ID File for copyrighted audio and video material, and stores it in a database. When a video is uploaded, it is checked against the database, and flagged as a copyright violation if a match is found. When this occurs, the content owner has the choice of blocking the video to make it unviewable, tracking the viewing statistics of the video, or adding advertisements to the "infringing" video with proceeds automatically going to the content owner.

Only uploaders who meet specific criteria can use Content ID. These criteria make the use of Content ID without the aid of a major backer difficult, limiting its usage to big corporations in practice.

Context 

Between 2007 and 2009, companies including Viacom, Mediaset, and the English Premier League filed lawsuits against YouTube, claiming that it has done too little to prevent the uploading of copyrighted material. Viacom, demanding $1 billion in damages, said that it had found more than 150,000 unauthorized clips of its material on YouTube that had been viewed "an astounding 1.5 billion times".

During the same court battle, Viacom won a court ruling requiring YouTube to hand over 12 terabytes of data detailing the viewing habits of every user who had watched videos on the site. On March 18, 2014, the lawsuit was settled after seven years with an undisclosed agreement.

History 
In June 2007, YouTube began trials of a system for automatic detection of uploaded videos that infringe copyright. Google CEO Eric Schmidt regarded this system as necessary for resolving lawsuits such as the one from Viacom, which alleged that YouTube profited from content that it did not have the right to distribute. The system was initially called "Video Identification" and later became known as Content ID. By 2010, YouTube had "already invested tens of millions of dollars in this technology". In 2011, YouTube described Content ID as "very accurate in finding uploads that look similar to reference files that are of sufficient length and quality to generate an effective ID File".

By 2012, Content ID accounted for over a third of the monetized views on YouTube.

In 2016, Google stated that Content ID had paid out around $2 billion to copyright holders (compared to around $1 billion by 2014), and had cost $60 million to develop.

Since mid-2018, Google has been beta-testing a new tool called Copyright Match, a simplified version of Content ID with more limited options, which would be available to uploaders with more than 100,000 views. However, contrary to Content ID, which sends copyright notices automatically, with Copyright Match no action is taken until the creator chooses to do so.

Trademark lawsuit 
In 2006, YouTube and content protection company Audible Magic signed an agreement to license the use of Audible Magic's own "Content ID" fingerprinting technology. When Google bought YouTube in November the same year, the license was transferred to Google. The agreement was terminated in 2009, but in 2014 Google obtained a trademark for their own "Content ID" implementation. Audible Magic sued Google the same year on the basis that they owned the "Content ID" trademark and therefore that Google trademarking their implementation was a fraud.

Criticism 

An independent test in 2009 uploaded multiple versions of the same song to YouTube, and concluded that while the system was "surprisingly resilient" in finding copyright violations in the audio tracks of videos, it was not infallible. The use of Content ID to remove material automatically has led to controversy in some cases, as the videos have not been checked by a human for fair use.

If a YouTube user disagrees with a decision by Content ID, it is possible to fill in a form disputing the decision. However, this claim is sent directly to the party that owns the supposed copyright, who has the final decision in the matter unless legal action is pursued. If the reporting party denies their claim, the channel receives a strike. If a channel receives three strikes, it is removed from the platform. Prior to 2016, videos weren't monetized until the dispute was resolved.

In December 2013, Google changed the way the system worked (seemingly to cover YouTube in case of lawsuits), leading to numerous content creation copyright notices being sent to YouTube accounts. Those notices led to ad revenues being automatically diverted to third parties, which sometimes had no connection to the games.

Since April 2016, videos continue to be monetized while the dispute is in progress, and the money goes to whoever won the dispute. Should the uploader want to monetize the video again, they may remove the disputed audio in the "Video Manager". YouTube has cited the effectiveness of Content ID as one of the reasons why the site's rules were modified in December 2010 to allow some users to upload videos of unlimited length.

The music industry has criticized Content ID as inefficient, with Universal Music Publishing Group (UMPG) estimating in a 2015 filing to the US Copyright Office "that Content ID fails to identify upwards of 40 percent of the use of UMPG’s compositions on YouTube". Google has countered these assertions by stating that (as of 2016) Content ID detected over 98% of known copyright infringement on YouTube and humans filing removal notices only 2%.

In January 2018, a YouTube uploader who created a white noise generator received copyright notices about a video he uploaded which was created using this tool and therefore contained only white noise.

In September 2018, a German university professor uploaded videos with several classical music performances for which their copyright had expired, because both the composers were dead long ago, and the performances were not covered anymore by copyright. After he received several copyright violations by YouTube, he could lift the majority of them, but Deutsche Grammophon refused to lift two of them even if their copyright had expired. In other cases, copyright violations notices were even sent to uploaders who recorded themselves playing public domain classical music, with Sony Music asserting copyright over more than 1,100 compositions by Johann Sebastian Bach via Content ID. Commentators noted that this was also the case on other platforms such as Facebook.

In December 2018 TheFatRat complained that Content ID gave preference to an obvious scammer who used the automated system to claim ownership of his content and thereby steal his revenue.

In April 2019, WatchMojo - one of the largest YouTube channels with over 20 million subscribers and 15 billion views with an extensive library of videos that rely on fair use - released a video that relied on its 10-year experiences managing claims and strikes via Content ID to highlight instances of alleged abuse. In a follow-up video, the channel estimated that rights holders had unlawfully claimed over $2 billion from 2014–19.

See also 
 Acoustic fingerprint
 EU Directive on Copyright in the Digital Single Market
 Fingerprint (computing)
 Media Identification Code (MID)

References

External links 
 How Content ID works - YouTube Help

YouTube
Alphabet Inc.
2007 software
YouTube controversies
Digital rights management
Criticism of Google
Google software
Copyright infringement